The 1912–13 United States collegiate men's ice hockey season was the 19th season of collegiate ice hockey.

Regular season

Standings

References

1912–13 NCAA Standings

External links
College Hockey Historical Archives

 
College